Telephone numbers in Luxembourg employ a closed dialling system, whereby all numbers are dialed in the same format whether from within Luxembourg or from abroad. There is no trunk prefix like "0".

The incumbent operator employed an open numbering plan with numbers of varying lengths, where a two-digit area identifier is followed by one to four digits, all six digits forming the subscriber number. This was changed by the introduction of a new numbering plan in 1999. Telephone numbers introduced since May 2000 by the incumbent operator begin with "2" (generally 26, 24 and recently 27) followed by two to six digits. The area identifier is still present and generally following the 26, 27 or 24, however numbers can be ported to any other area.

 79 xxxx           (example number in Consdorf)
 +352 79 xxxx        (when dialed from outside Luxembourg)
 2679 xxxx           (example number in Consdorf for new lines since May 2000)
 +352 2679 xxxx        (when dialed from outside Luxembourg)
 4 xxx xx      (example number in Luxembourg City)
 +352 4 xxx xx   (when dialed from outside Luxembourg)

In Luxembourg, PBX extensions were generally appended to the main number, hence the need for an open numbering plan. As more PBXs were installed in offices in Luxembourg compared to areas with almost exclusively residential customers, this led to the impression that numbers in Luxembourg City would be longer than six digits. The regulator therefore decided that new phone numbers must be eight digits long including the extension. In order to fulfill this requirement, operators have to shorten a customer's phone number to 3-6 digits, to allow 2-5 digit extensions.

Areas

Mobile Numbers

Mobile telephone numbers always carry a three-digit network code, in the format "6x1", which is followed by six digits. The leading "6" of these numbers is not omitted when dialing from abroad.

 6x1 xxx xxx       (within Luxembourg)
 +352 6x1 xxx xxx    (outside Luxembourg)

These codes were introduced on 1 September 2006, replacing codes in the format "0x1". Existing numbers were converted to the new format.

Starting January 2019, the voice mail number is generic, reachable only from the subscriber itself (or as result of the call forwarding when busy/non reachable ...):
352691000700

Until January 2019, the voice mail number followed the below rule:
Each mobile number has an equivalent voicemail number, the network code is in the format "6x8" (note: except for Join Experience, they are not using it).

The mobile network codes are:

 621: POST Telecom (formerly LuxGSM)
 651: Eltrona (mvno on POST Telecom), starting 2017
 661: Orange Luxembourg
 671: Join Experience
 691: Tango Mobile

In June 2009, a new numbering range for mobile machine-to-machine communication was introduced. The numbers have a fixed length of 12 digits and start with "60", the only assigned network code from this range is:

 6021: POST Telecom (formerly LuxGSM)

References

Luxembourg
Communications in Luxembourg
Luxembourg communications-related lists